Gossip Girl is an American teen drama television series based on the novel series of the same name written by Cecily von Ziegesar. The series, developed for television by Josh Schwartz and Stephanie Savage, ran on The CW network for six seasons from September 19, 2007, to December 17, 2012.

Narrated by the unknown, omniscient blogger "Gossip Girl" (voiced by Kristen Bell), the series revolves around the lives of privileged upper-class adolescents living in Manhattan's Upper East Side (UES). The series begins with the return of Upper East Side teenage "it girl" Serena van der Woodsen (Blake Lively) from a mysterious absence. She is reunited with her popular frenemy Blair Waldorf (Leighton Meester) and her mother Lily (Kelly Rutherford), and she also meets Dan Humphrey (Penn Badgley)—an aspiring writer from Brooklyn who is one of Serena's main love interests throughout the show. Other main characters include Nate Archibald (Chace Crawford), Chuck Bass (Ed Westwick), Jenny Humphrey (Taylor Momsen), Vanessa Abrams (Jessica Szohr), Rufus Humphrey (Matthew Settle) and Ivy Dickens (Kaylee DeFer).

The success of Gossip Girl led to many adaptations outside the United States. The show received numerous award nominations and won 18 Teen Choice Awards. The CW officially renewed Gossip Girl for a sixth and final season on May 11, 2012. The final season, consisting of 10 episodes, premiered on October 8, 2012, and ended on December 17, 2012.

A sequel series, also titled Gossip Girl and headed by original executive producers Schwartz, Savage and Safran, premiered on July 8, 2021, on HBO Max. While set in the same continuity and retaining Kristen Bell as narrator, this series focuses on a new cast of characters from a different perspective in the same setting—likened to that of a shared universe.

Series overview
The show centers on the scandalous lives of attractive, privileged and very affluent teens who reside in Manhattan's Upper East Side (UES) and how they betray one another while being constantly observed by a vicious but well-known blogger.

Seasons

Cast and characters

Main
 Blake Lively as Serena van der Woodsen, a student at the Constance Billard School for Girls. An it girl who frequently receives media attention. 
 Leighton Meester as Blair Waldorf, the Queen Bee of Constance Billard. Best friends with Serena and highly focused on status, wealth and academic achievement. Her relationship with Chuck is a key theme throughout all 6 seasons.
 Penn Badgley as Dan Humphrey, a student at St. Jude's School for Boys. Dan initially does not fit in with the Upper East Side teenagers as he lives in Brooklyn and is not a legacy student, but rather attends St. Jude's with a partial scholarship. Dan aspires to be a writer.
 Chace Crawford as Nate Archibald, a student at St. Jude's. Blair's childhood boyfriend and the UES golden boy.
 Taylor Momsen as Jenny Humphrey (seasons 1–4; guest, season 6), a student at Constance Billard's and Dan's younger sister. Jenny dreams of becoming a fashion designer, who begins as one of Blair's minions in order to gain status. She later rejects the Upper East Side life and becomes rivals with Blair and sleeps with Chuck. 
 Ed Westwick as Chuck Bass, a student at St. Jude's. Son of one of New York's most successful real estate moguls. Decadent and amoral, Chuck is mainly interested in women and alcohol. Once his father dies in the second season, he inherits Bass Industries and becomes a young billionaire. He is romantically involved with Blair throughout the series but they do not start officially dating until the third season. Blair and Chuck's relationship is a key theme throughout all 6 seasons. 
 Kelly Rutherford as Lily van der Woodsen (née Rhodes), Serena's and Eric's mother and a three-time divorcée. A former photographer, Lily has become one of the UES's most influential socialites. She and Serena often have a strained and rocky relationship. 
 Matthew Settle as Rufus Humphrey, Dan and Jenny's father. Former rockstar as the lead singer for the band Lincoln Hawk, a 90s one-hit wonder, Rufus now owns a gallery in Brooklyn. Rufus shares a romantic history with Lily, whom he marries in season 3 but divorces in season 6. He also shares a son with Lilly, who he was unaware of until the end of season 3.
 Jessica Szohr as Vanessa Abrams (seasons 1–4; guest, season 6), Dan's childhood best friend who is home-schooled. Vanessa wants to become a documentary filmmaker. She has romantic interest in Nate, Dan and Chuck. 
 Kaylee DeFer as Ivy Dickens (seasons 5–6; recurring, season 4), who is introduced to the Van der Woodsens as their cousin Charlie Rhodes.
The series is narrated by Kristen Bell as the voice of "Gossip Girl", an online anonymous figure. Bell appears via voice-over in every episodes but is uncredited. She also appears in person as herself in the series finale.

Selected recurring
 Connor Paolo as Eric van der Woodsen, Serena's younger brother. Both Serena and Eric are children from Lily's first marriage to William van der Woodsen.
 Zuzanna Szadkowski as Dorota Kishlovsky, the Waldorfs's Polish housekeeper and Blair's closest confidante. She is often shown as a mother figure to Blair as Eleanor has often been absent in Blair's life due to work. 
 Margaret Colin and Wallace Shawn as Eleanor Waldorf and Cyrus Rose, Blair's mother, a successful fashion designer, and stepfather, an entertainment lawyer who regards Blair as his own daughter
 Michelle Trachtenberg and Sebastian Stan as Georgina Sparks and Carter Baizen, old and troublesome acquaintances of the UES group
 Robert John Burke as Bartholomew Bass, Chuck's father, one of New York's most successful real estate moguls who is married to Lily
 Amanda Setton, Nicole Fiscella, Nan Zhang, Dreama Walker, Yin Chang, and Alice Callahan as Penelope Shafai, Isabel Coates, Kati Farkas, Hazel Williams, Nelly Yuki, and Jessica Leitenberg, the clique of mean girl "minions" following Blair

Production

Development
The Gossip Girl book series was originally supposed to be adapted into a film starring Lindsay Lohan with head Gilmore Girls creator Amy Sherman-Palladino. When the film project did not get off the ground, Stephanie Savage and Josh Schwartz took over the project to create a television series. As of October 2006, Schwartz was working on the pilot. He said, "I was very skeptical. I don't want to do The O.C. NYC. But I thought the books were smart. The characters are worldly in a way that Orange County kids aren't." The characteristics for each character in the pilot were based on the first Gossip Girl book. In January 2007, the show was given the green light by The CW.

Production team
The O.C. creator Josh Schwartz and fellow writer Stephanie Savage served as the show's executive producers throughout the series' run, followed by Bob Levy and Leslie Morgenstein of Alloy Entertainment, who were assigned in aiding the adaptation of the novels into the series. Following the success of Gossip Girl, Gilmore Girls co-producer, John Stephens was approached by Schwartz and Savage, having previously worked with him on The O.C., and hired him as an executive producer. Joshua Safran, who started as a writer/consulting producer before becoming co-executive producer, was later added as an executive producer. On April 24, 2012, it was announced that he would leave the show at the end of the fifth season to be the new showrunner of NBC's now-cancelled musical series Smash. To fill in Safran's void, co-executive producer Sara Goodman was promoted to executive producer for the sixth season. Alexandra Patsavas who worked with Schwartz on The O.C. was in charge of the music. Eric Daman was at the head of the costume department; he previously had assisted Patricia Field on Sex and the City.

Casting
Featuring nine regular speaking roles, the majority of the ensemble cast was assembled from February to April 2007. Leighton Meester and Blake Lively–who started auditioning in December 2006–were the first two actresses to be chosen in February for the lead roles of Blair Waldorf and Serena van der Woodsen, respectively. Penn Badgley, who had previously worked with Stephanie Savage on The Mountain, Taylor Momsen, Chace Crawford, Kelly Rutherford, and Connor Paolo also auditioned successfully and landed roles in the series in March, as did Florencia Lozano who appeared only in the pilot, and was later replaced by Margaret Colin. Badgley at first turned down the part of Dan, as did Lively—who planned to attend college—for the role of Serena. Actors for the roles of Chuck Bass and Rufus Humphrey were found in April when English actor Ed Westwick, and Matthew Settle were cast. Westwick first read for the role of Nate but was then asked to try Chuck. As rumors swirled about the impending cancellation of Veronica Mars, it was revealed at The CW's 2007 Upfronts on May 17, 2007, that Kristen Bell had narrated the pilot, thus making her the title character of another show on the network. Of the casting, Bell said:

Jessica Szohr was signed on to portray the recurring role of Vanessa Abrams and received regular status during the fourteenth episode of the first season. Kaylee DeFer joined the series in the eighteenth episode of the fourth season and was promoted to series regular for the show's fifth season.

At the conclusion of the fourth season, Momsen, who went on an indefinite hiatus during the season while retaining regular billing, and Jessica Szohr both left the show. Throughout the series' run, Connor Paolo consistently declined to elevate his recurring role of Eric van der Woodsen to regular status, citing personal reasons for his decision. After becoming a regular on the ABC series Revenge, Paolo confirmed his departure from Gossip Girl in August 2011.

As the show progressed, numerous recurring guest stars appeared in the show. Michelle Trachtenberg signed on to portray Georgina Sparks. The role had previously been offered to Mischa Barton who declined the role. Francie Swift and Sam Robards took the parental roles of Anne and Howard Archibald, respectively. Caroline Lagerfelt portrayed Celia "CeCe" Rhodes, Serena and Eric's grandmother and Lily's mother. Sebastian Stan made several appearances as Carter Baizen throughout the show's first three seasons.

Filming locations

Primarily filming in New York, Gossip Girl has been declared by New York Magazine as the "Most Restauranty Show Since Sex and the City", citing the pilot episode filming locales such as the Japanese restaurant Geisha, the Campbell Apartment where Nate and Serena were filmed having sex, and the New York Palace Hotel bar Gilt. Other New York City landmarks and well-known establishments were filmed throughout the first season. Victor/Victrola filmed the fictional infamous Chuck Bass burlesque club, Victrola, at The Box Manhattan, a sister club to The Box Soho in London. The fictional Constance Billard-St.Judes School, based on novel writer Cecily Von Ziegesar's alma mater, Nightingale-Bamford used external shots of the Museum of the City of New York.

The second season premiered at the Hamptons and began filming in mid-June. The season premiere opening montage showed a scene at Cooper's Beach that was instead filmed in Rockaway Beach followed by an elaborate white party. For the sixth episode of the season, Columbia University was used to film the Yale campus, an episode that followed disappointment from Yale fans due to its erroneous portrayal of the admissions process and reliance on Ivy League university stereotypes. During the season's seventh episode, the Brooklyn Inn was integrated into the show. Remaining true to its New York locations, the show filmed at the Russian Tea Room.

The fourth season premiered on September 13, 2010, with the first two episodes filmed in Paris. New York Magazine revealed several locations shot at the French University, La Sorbonne in the Latin District (or Quartier Latin) of Paris on July 5. Other locations include the Musée d'Orsay, the Eiffel Tower, the Gare du Nord, Avenue Montaigne. and Saint-Germain-des-Prés. Columbia University became the primary filming location for the first few episodes of the season following the Paris story arc.

The fifth season premiered on September 26, 2011, with the first two episodes filmed in Los Angeles, California.

Because of its location in New York, executive producer Stephanie Savage said, "We were quickly told it would be too expensive, too complicated" at the beginning of the series. She said that it had been proposed to shoot in a Los Angeles studio that would recreate Central Park, but they eventually filmed the series in New York. Savage explained their choice to film there, "There's no New York City on TV, or there wasn't when we started making the pilot, except what you could see in the background behind the dead bodies on cop shows. We've never seen the city from the point of view of teenagers. It felt like a world with high stakes for young people." Schwartz added, "What's funny about these teenagers is they grew up watching Sex and the City, even though it wasn't about them. And I think they've probably incorporated that into how they mythologize New York. I fought really hard to shoot the show in New York because we want New York to be a character in the show." Many scenes were filmed in the Empire Hotel on the Upper West Side.

Episode format
Each episode begins with the home page of the Gossip Girl website and Serena's picture from the pilot episode. Afterward, a recap of events relevant to the upcoming narrative is shown, which ends again with the home page of the website, only this time with a picture from other character(s) with a text about a recent event connected with the picture.
	
The narrator is Gossip Girl, voiced by actress Kristen Bell. She begins the recap with the sentence, "Gossip Girl here, your one and only source into the scandalous lives of Manhattan's elite," and ends the recap with whispered voices saying "Where has she been?" and "Serena." Then, the voice of Gossip Girl says, "And who am I? That's one secret I'll never tell! You know you love me... XOXO, Gossip Girl."

During each episode, there is always a social event taking place, whether small or large. Joshua Safran explained, "We structure it [the show] so that every week, the episode leads to an event. I feel like it is much like a procedural."

Episode titles
All of the episodes' titles are based on the name of a film or a novel. For example, episode "The Wild Brunch" evokes western film The Wild Bunch and "Seventeen Candles" Sixteen Candles. Episode "All About My Brother" refers to Pedro Almodóvar's All About My Mother while "Pret-a-Poor-J" came from Prêt-à-Porter. "There Might Be Blood" took its title from 2007 film There Will Be Blood. "The Serena Also Rises" was titled after novel The Sun Also Rises. The fifth-season episode "The Big Sleep No More" was named for the film The Big Sleep and the New York-based production Sleep No More. Episode "Easy J" was titled after Emma Stone's hit movie Easy A. Episode "The Age of Dissonance", which was titled after Edith Wharton's novel The Age of Innocence, saw a high school production of the novel taking place, and "The Blair Bitch Project" was named after The Blair Witch Project. "Victor, Victrola" is named after the British-American musical comedy Victor/Victoria. "Bad News Blair" was named after the 1976 movie The Bad News Bears.

Joshua Safran said, "we draw from classic works like Les Liaisons Dangereuses and The Great Gatsby as much as we do from pop culture."

Product placement
Gossip Girl is known for its product placement. The show had a contract with Verizon Wireless for its first five seasons; all the characters were seen with phones chosen by the brand until the deal ended by the sixth season. During their contract, Verizon Wireless offered exclusive Gossip Girl content and created a website where ringtones of the songs featured on the show could be downloaded. Barbra Robin, The CW's senior vice president of Integrated Marketing, stated: "It was really about showing features on a device. [...] Initially, it was just a wireless phone, but eventually that became a smartphone, a tablet, all these other types of technology that took them through their day and showed how they used it to get from one place to the next."

In mid-2008, executives of VitaminWater approached The CW for a placement deal. During the second season, the drinks were mentioned several times in dialogues. The partnership helped pay the costs of shooting on location in the Hamptons. An HP TouchPad was prominently displayed in an episode of the sixth season. According to OneNewsNow.com, other sponsors have included Procter & Gamble, L'Oreal, Target and Johnson & Johnson, which allowed the series to earn $28.2million in advertising revenue in 2007.

Distribution and release
Gossip Girl aired on The CW on Mondays. In addition to the television broadcast of the show, episodes of Gossip Girl have also been released on the Internet. In October 2011, The CW signed a deal allowing all Gossip Girl episodes to be streamed on Netflix. The same month, the network signed a deal with Hulu. Both CWTV.com and Hulu streamed episodes for free, but only the five most recent installments were available for viewing.
All seasons of Gossip Girl are also available through the iTunes Store and Amazon Video where each episode can be purchased separately or in complete season sets.

As of 2012, the series was broadcast in 197 countries.

On January 1, 2021, Gossip Girl moved from Netflix to WarnerMedia's streaming service HBO Max. WarnerMedia is the parent company of the series' production company, Warner Bros. Television.

Syndication
On July 25, 2012, Style Network announced that it had acquired the off-network rights to Gossip Girl and started airing repeats of the show on August 15, 2012.

Home media
The DVD sets of each season were released in various regions after their television broadcast.

Notes:
In Australia there is alternative cover art for the first season. There are also three different versions of the second season (the standard edition, a special 8-disc edition, and an alternative cover art—which is the same cover art used for part two of the second season in the UK).
The second season was first released in two parts in Region 2. Part one was released on April 13, 2009, and part two was released on August 10, 2009, while the complete season was released later, on September 28, 2009.

Reception

Critical response

Gossip Girl initially received positive reviews. Due to the show's pedigree as an adaptation of The New York Times best-selling novel series, the show was considered to be one of the more anticipated new shows of the 2007–2008 television season. An August 2007 survey by OTX, a global media research and consulting firm, placed the show on the list of top ten new shows that viewers were aware of. Though the pilot was the recipient of many positive reviews from publications such as Variety, The Washington Post, San Francisco Chronicle and the Boston Globe, other reviewers described it as a guilty pleasure rather than an hour's worth of must-watch television. Metacritic gave it a score of 59, based on the reviews of 40 different publications.

Toward the conclusion of the first season, Janet Malcolm of The New Yorker criticized the show for its deviations from the novels. She has stated that the series was "related to the original only in the names and outlines of the characters". She further asserted that, "Without von Ziegesar's fast, mocking commentary to propel them, the TV episodes are sluggish and crass—a move from Barneys to Kmart." However, author Cecily von Ziegesar has expressed support for the show, noting that all of her major plot points were present in the pilot.

As the show continued its first season, the response became considerably more positive, and by the second season critical response was favorable. Metacritic gave the new season an improved score of 71. "Summer's been good to this girl," claimed Entertainment Weekly, who awarded the series its highest grade of "A". The New York Daily News claimed the show had found its footing by stating "It knows exactly what it wants and needs its new hybrid product to be. The hockey fights video of teen romance drama." Gossip Girl was designated the "Greatest Teen Drama of All Time" by New York magazine. The magazine wrote, "the show has resurrected the potential for scripted dramas to be effective social satire—to present a world more accurately than a 'reality' program can. Gossip Girl presents a wealth-eye view of the city, but because it is a cartoon we can laugh along with the conspicuousness of the consumption."

The Christian Parents Television Council has shown particular criticism of the series, especially with its "OMFG" ad campaign from April 2008. It also named the episode "Victor/Victrola" the worst television program of the week in which the episode originally was broadcast. Quotes from the Parents Television Council review, as well as negative quotes from the San Diego Union-Tribune, New York Post and the Boston Herald, were used on various advertisements for the second season. The Hartford Courant chronicled a variety of negative responses to the ads. The ads included quotes like "Every Parent's Nightmare", "Mind-Blowingly Inappropriate" and "A Nasty Piece of Work" in what appears to be an effort to continue the "rebellious teen" style of the show.

With the approach of the fifth season, New York magazine reviewed the life expectancy of the show, noting its waning cultural relevancy despite the growing prominence of its actors, and the loss of its status as The CW's number-one show, having been beaten out in terms of ratings by other shows of the network like Supernatural and 90210. "The series itself hasn't quite kept up, even if its plotting is as juicy and lunatic as ever." and that "The cast would all rather be making movies, while the showrunners are focusing on launching new projects via their nascent Fake Empire production company (including CW newcomer Hart of Dixie). Barring an unexpected brand reboot or another stab at a spinoff, we're afraid the end is near. XOXO." AOL TV ranked Gossip Girl the 20th Best School Show of All Time and the 4th TV's Biggest Guilty Pleasure. The show was declared the tenth highest-rated show for the first ten years of IMDb.com Pro (2002–2012).

There was much controversy around Dan being revealed as Gossip Girl in the season finale. Dan had always struggled to be an insider among the Upper East Side and had supposedly created Gossip Girl to gain more power and had been the one "pulling the strings the whole time," as mentioned by Serena in the finale. However, there was much speculation and controversy regarding this decision. Penn Badgley, who played Dan, stated in an interview that he himself found it funny that the writers had decided to make him be Gossip Girl and that he did not know about the reveal before shooting the series finale. Badgley cited the numerous instances of Dan appearing to be shocked by a Gossip Girl blast while alone, which would not make sense if Dan had been the one posting on Gossip Girl.

Cultural influence
CW executive Dawn Ostroff later compared Gossip Girls role as the show that defined its network to House of Cards for Netflix. Its television audience was never very large, but the show was influential on culture; Savage recalled that the crew likened working on it to working for a lifestyle magazine. Bell stated, "[Schwartz and Savage] were spearheading: 'What if the Internet is just a place to judge people? What if that's what it turns into?' And they turned out to be Nostradamus."

A hairstylist for the show compared media interest in Lively's hair to that for Jennifer Aniston's "The Rachel". In 2008, The New York Times reported the show has had a profound impact on retail, saying Gossip Girl is probably "the first [show] to have been conceived, in part, as a fashion marketing vehicle". While it has had middling success in terms of ratings, it "may well be the biggest influence in the youth culture market", said a trendspotter. However, for Maheen Humayun of The Tempest, the show emphasized toxic cultural traits, like rape culture, that "messed up a whole generation." According to Zoe Fox of Mashable, the show popularized social media networks and mobile communication, becoming "a pioneer in its use of mobile". In 2008, New York Magazine named the series as "Best Show Ever". In 2009, Rolling Stone named the series as "TV's Hottest Show".

On January 26, 2012, in honor of the series' 100th episode, New York City Mayor Michael Bloomberg visited the set and proclaimed the date Gossip Girl Day, citing the show's cultural influence and impact on the economy of the city. "Gossip Girl has made New York a central character. While Gossip Girl is drawing fans in with its plot twists, the show also attracts many of them to visit New York, contributing to our incredible 50.5million visitors last year. In fact, the economic impact of Gossip Girl and other television shows and films that are made in New York really can be felt directly in all five boroughs. The 100th episode of Gossip Girl is a real landmark, and I want to congratulate the show's cast and crew," he stated.

The popularity of the series was also indirectly responsible for the creation of the reality series NYC Prep, which ran for one season on Bravo. The series has been referenced in films such as Fired Up!, Get Him To The Greek, Vampires Suck, Easy A, Just Go With It and Horrible Bosses, and TV series such as Royal Pains, Entourage, Parks and Recreation, Skam, 30 Rock, Skins, and Shameless, among others.

Popular among teenagers and young adults, the Gossip Girl cast has posed on the cover of numerous mainstream magazines, including Rolling Stone, People, Nylon, New York Magazine, TV Guide, New York Post, Vogue, Out Magazine, Details, and Entertainment Weekly.

Ratings
The series premiere was watched by 3.50 million viewers and achieved a 1.6 Adults 18–49, coming in last place in its 9:00 pm timeslot on Wednesday nights. However, the show was noted to have held the best audience retention of America's Next Top Model. Benefiting from the network rerunning the show during the 2008 WGA strike, the season ended with 3.00 million viewers. The second season premiered with 3.43 million viewers. The second season ended with 2.23 million viewers. The third season premiered with 2.55 million viewers. The third season ended with 1.96 million viewers. The fourth season premiered to 1.83 million viewers and a 1.0 for adults 18–49. Episode 4.04 hit season highs in all categories with a 2.8 rating in The CW's target of Women 18–34, a 1.7 in Adults 18–34 and 1.1 in Adults 18–49. The fourth season ended with 1.36 million viewers. The fifth season premiered with 1.37 million viewers. The fifth season ended with 1.44 million viewers.

Despite this, throughout the fifth season, Gossip Girl continued to see a decrease in viewers. The sixth season premiered to 0.78million viewers, making it not only the least viewed season premiere for the series, but also the least viewed episode in show's six-year run. The following episode saw a decrease to 0.76million viewers, which once again marked a new series low in terms of viewers. The series finale was watched by 1.55million viewers, the highest viewed episode since season four.

Awards and accolades

DVR ratings
2007
2008
2009
2010
2011

Online ratings
The series was the 5th most-binged TV series on Subscription Video-on-Demand (SVOD) Services; derived from NPD's VideoWatch Digital, consumer tracker based on data from 313,866 SVOD TV transactions across 26,176 SVOD subscribers that were completed between January 2012 and January 2013.<ref>{{cite press release |title=FOXs "Prison Break" Leads List of Most-Binged TV Series on Subscription Video-on-Demand (SVOD) Services |date=March 26, 2013 |publisher=The NPD Group |location=Port Washington, NY |url=https://www.npd.com/wps/portal/npd/us/news/press-releases/foxs-prison-break-leads-list-of-most-binged-tv-series-on-subscription-video-on-demand-svod-services/ |access-date=December 9, 2017 |archive-date=April 6, 2018 |archive-url=https://web.archive.org/web/20180406084703/https://www.npd.com/wps/portal/npd/us/news/press-releases/foxs-prison-break-leads-list-of-most-binged-tv-series-on-subscription-video-on-demand-svod-services/ |url-status=live}}</ref>

Merchandise

Soundtrack

The first soundtrack of the TV series, OMFGG – Original Music Featured On Gossip Girl, No. 1 was released digitally on September 2, 2008, and in stores on October 28, 2008.

FashionGossip Girl was very influential on fashion for teenage and young adult women. The show was intended in part as a way for fashion companies to market their products. Some brands paid a fee, and the show's Web site provided referral links so viewers could purchase items they saw on television. In 2009, Anna Sui created a line inspired by Gossip Girl. Daman, who based his costumes on what Manhattan private-school students wore,, said that by the sixth season the show was "getting one-of-a-kind couture from Paris", because "they wanted their wares on Blake Lively".

On September 16, 2011, it was announced that Warner Bros. and label Romeo & Juliet Couture had partnered to create Gossip Girls official clothing line inspired by lead characters Serena van der Woodsen and Blair Waldorf. The launch of the fashion line took place on September 26, 2011, the same day as the premiere of the fifth season.

Cosmetics online retailer Birchbox and Gossip Girl have teamed up to create a special Birchbox edition filled with beauty products inspired by the show. The products were chosen by Gossip Girl makeup department head, Amy Tagliamonti, and hair department head, Jennifer Johnson.

International adaptationsGossip Girl spawned several adaptations in other countries. The Turkish adaptation is known as Little Secrets. Little Secrets contains numerous differences from the original TV series. "Gossip Girl" role is main role "Ayşegül" and her identity isn't secret. Chuck has been rewritten, with Serena and later Ayşegül, being love interests. Blair has been rewritten, Serena's loser friend and obsessed lover to Nate.

On March 5, 2012, it was reported that Warner Bros. International Television and Metan Development Group would produce a Chinese teen drama series called China Girl inspired by Gossip Girl. Production was set to start in June 2012 with the show airing in November. The show was to follow the lives of students at a university instead of a high school. No news of the actual broadcast followed.

A Mexican version of the series was produced by Mexican producer Pedro Torres as Gossip Girl: Acapulco. The show stars Sofía Sisniega, Oka Giner, Jon Ecker, Vadhir Derbez, Diego Amozurrutia, and Macarena Achaga. Filming of the Mexican adaptation began in January 2013 and the series aired on July 5, 2013, on Televisa. The show also aired in the United States on Univision in 2014. It was not renewed for a second season.

Another version of Gossip Girl aired in Thailand on Channel 3 beginning July 16, 2015, dubbed as Gossip Girl: Thailand.

An Indonesian adaptation of the show known as Gossip Girl Indonesia, has been announced during the launch of GoPlay, a video-on-demand service by the country's popular ridesharing app, Gojek, with Nia Dinata as its showrunner, premiered on the platform on February 14, 2020.

Sequel

A sequel to the series was released on WarnerMedia's streaming service HBO Max. The new series received an initial 10-episode order and picks up nine years after the original Gossip Girl site went dark, as a new generation of private school teens are introduced to the watchful eye of Gossip Girl. These new characters also attend the Upper East Side prep school Constance Billard, as did the characters of the original series. Josh Schwartz confirmed the new series would be a continuation rather than a reboot. Leighton Meester, the actress who played Blair Waldorf, confirmed on Good Morning America'' that she would not be a part of the sequel. When asked, Meester answered, "I was not asked to be on it, so no." Chace Crawford also confirmed that he had not been asked to be a part of the sequel; however, he noted he would be open to making an appearance. In November 2019, it was announced Kristen Bell would be returning as the voice of Gossip Girl in the new series.

References

External links
 
 
 
 

 
2000s American high school television series
2000s American teen drama television series
2007 American television series debuts
2010s American high school television series
2010s American teen drama television series
2012 American television series endings
Coming-of-age television shows
The CW original programming
English-language television shows
Fashion-themed television series
Mass media portrayals of the upper class
Serial drama television series
Television series about bullying
Television series about teenagers
Television series by Alloy Entertainment
Television series by CBS Studios
Television series by Warner Bros. Television Studios
Television shows based on American novels
Television shows filmed in Los Angeles
Television shows filmed in New York City
Television shows set in Manhattan